KKIX (103.9 FM) is a radio station in Fayetteville, Arkansas with a country music format. The station is owned and operated by iHeartMedia.  The station was previously home to KNWA Radio.

References

External links

KIX
Radio stations established in 1966
IHeartMedia radio stations